Graceless Go I is a 1974 TV movie starring Stanley Baker.

External links

1974 television films
1974 films
1974 in British television
British television films
1970s English-language films